There are seven prime ministers of Canada with military service. Four prime ministers served with the sedentary militias or active militias of the Province of Canada, or the succeeding Canadian Confederation during the 19th century. Two served with the Canadian Expeditionary Force (CEF) during First World War. The last prime minister to serve in the military was Pierre Trudeau, who joined the army's Canadian Officers' Training Corps during the Second World War.

The prime ministers with military experience have only served with the land forces of Canada, the active militias/Canadian Army, or the CEF. No prime minister has served in the other branches of the Canadian Forces, the Royal Canadian Air Force and Royal Canadian Navy. Lester B. Pearson is the only prime minister to serve in the British Army, having transferred to the Royal Flying Corps from the CEF.

In addition to military service, two prime ministers served as a defence minister prior to their premiership. Although John A. Macdonald was the first prime minister of confederated Canada, he previously served as the Minister of Militia and Defence for the Province of Canada. Kim Campbell is the only prime minister to serve as prime minister, and simultaneously hold the defence portfolio (as the Minister of National Defence).

The prime minister of Canada is not Commander-in-Chief of the Canadian Forces, rather the role is held by the Queen of Canada and is held on behalf of the monarch by the Governor General of Canada.

See also
 List of members of the Canadian House of Commons with military service

Notes

Sources

Canada
Military service